Breakup Song is the eleventh studio album by the band Deerhoof. It was released on September 4, 2012 on Polyvinyl Records. A music video for the album's title track was released on June 3, 2013. It was directed by Pieter Dirkx.

Track listing

Personnel
Deerhoof - performance, production

References

2012 albums
Deerhoof albums
Polyvinyl Record Co. albums